Kovanice is a municipality and village in Nymburk District in the Central Bohemian Region of the Czech Republic. It has about 900 inhabitants.

Administrative parts
The village of Chvalovice is an administrative part of Kovanice.

History
The first written mention of Kovanice is from 1266.

References

Villages in Nymburk District